Akbarabad (also Romanized as Akbarābād) is a village in Qorqori Rural District, Qorqori District, Hirmand County, Sistan and Baluchestan Province, Iran. At the 2006 census, its population was 148, in 31 families.

References 

Populated places in Hirmand County